George Edwin MacLean (August 31, 1850 – May 3, 1938) was the eighth President of the University of Iowa, serving from 1899 to 1911.

Biography
George Edwin MacLean was born in Rockville, Connecticut on August 31, 1850.

He was an alumnus of Williams College (A.B. 1871, A.M. 1874, LL.D. 1895), Yale (B.D. 1874), and Leipzig (Ph.D. 1883). From 1884 to 1895 he was a professor of English language and literature at the University of Minnesota. From 1895 to 1899 he was the sixth Chancellor of the University of Nebraska.

He married Clara S. Taylor on May 20, 1874.

MacLean died at his home in Washington, D.C. on May 3, 1938.

References

External links
 

Presidents of the University of Iowa
1850 births
1938 deaths
Chancellors of the University of Nebraska-Lincoln
Yale University alumni
Williams College alumni
American expatriates in Germany
University of Minnesota faculty